Urban Council may refer to:
Hong Kong 
Urban Council (Hong Kong) 
Urban Council (constituency) 
Sri Lanka
Urban councils of Sri Lanka

See also 
City council 
Municipal council